Sodium-coupled neutral amino acid transporter 3 is a protein that in humans is encoded by the SLC38A3 gene.

See also
 Solute carrier family

References

Further reading

Solute carrier family